The 2022 Lakeside WDF World Championship was the first World Championship organised by the World Darts Federation. The tournament was held at the Lakeside Country Club in Frimley Green, Surrey, which hosted the now-defunct BDO World Darts Championship from 1986 to 2019. The titles were won by Neil Duff in the men's competition, and Beau Greaves in the women's.

The WDF made the decision to postpone the tournament by three months, due to growing concerns and potential government restrictions relating to the COVID-19 pandemic.

Neil Duff and Thibault Tricole became the first players from Northern Ireland and France respectively to reach the final of a World Darts Championship.

In his Last 16 victory over Luke Littler, Richard Veenstra recorded the highest three dart average in the venue's history with 104.91.

In her second-round match, Veronika Ihász hit the biggest outshot for a female competitor in world championship history with a 164.

18-year-old Beau Greaves became the youngest ever winner of a senior world championship, defeating Kirsty Hutchinson 4–0 in the final. She also produced a record average of 92.02, which stands as the best in a final of the Women's World Championship, and the third-best in the history of the Women’s World Championship.

Prize money

Schedule

Men's

Format and qualifiers
Qualifying criteria is as follows (cut-off date 4 December 2021):

 Top 16 players in WDF World Rankings (seeded)
 Latest winners of the eleven Platinum/Gold ranked tournaments (World Championship, World Masters (later cancelled), Dutch Open, Scottish Open, England Open, Denmark Open, British Open, Welsh Open, Seacoast Open, Irish Open, World Open (later cancelled))
 First and second ranked players from each of eight regional tables (Australia, Canada, East Europe, New Zealand, North Europe, UK/Ireland, USA, West Europe)
 Next highest ranked players in the WDF World Rankings to bring the total entry list to 44
 Two qualifiers from the final qualification tournament in Assen, Netherlands on 5 December 2021
 Two qualifiers from the final qualification tournament in Frimley Green, England on 5 December 2021

Seeded players begin the competition in the second round. The remaining 32 qualifiers will start in the first round.

The top 16 men in the world rankings that accept their invitations will be seeded into the second round. The provisional list of seeds and invited players is as follows:

1–16 in WDF RankingsSeeded in second round
 
 
 
 
  (Champion)
 
 
 
 
 
 
 
 
 
 
 

Platinum/Gold title winners

  – 2020 World Championship
  – 2021 England Open
  – 2021 Denmark Open
  – 2021 British Open
  – 2021 Welsh Open
  – 2021 Seacoast Open
  – 2021 Irish Open
 

Regional Table QualifiersFirst round
  – Australia
  – Australia
  – Canada
  – Canada
  – Canada
  – East Europe
  – East Europe
  – New Zealand
  – New Zealand
  – North Europe
  – West Europe

  – UK/Ireland
  – USA
  – USA
  – West Europe

WDF Rankings to 44 playersFirst or second round
 
 
 
 
 
  
 
 
 
 
 
 
 
 
 

Assen QualifierFirst round
 

Lakeside QualifiersFirst round
 
 

AlternatesFirst round

Draw

Women's

Format and qualifiers
Qualifying criteria is as follows (cut-off date 4 December 2021):

 Top 8 players in WDF World Rankings (seeded)
 Latest winners of the eleven Platinum/Gold ranked tournaments (World Championship, World Masters (later cancelled), Dutch Open, Scottish Open, England Open, Denmark Open, British Open, Welsh Open, Seacoast Open, Irish Open, World Open (later cancelled))
 Top ranked players from each of eight regional tables (Australia, Canada, East Europe, New Zealand, North Europe, UK/Ireland, USA, West Europe)
 Next highest ranked players in the WDF World Rankings to bring the total entry list to 22
 One qualifier from the final qualification tournament in Assen, Netherlands on 5 December 2021
 One qualifier from the final qualification tournament in Frimley Green, England on 5 December 2021

Seeded players begin the competition in the second round. The remaining 16 qualifiers will start in the first round.

The top eight women in the world rankings that accept their invitations will be seeded into the second round. The provisional list of seeds and invited players is as follows:

1–8 in WDF RankingsSeeded in Second round
 
 
  
 
 
 
 
 

Platinum/Gold title winnersFirst round
  – 2020 World Championship
  – 2021 Seacoast Open

  – 2020 Dutch Open
  – 2020 Scottish Open
  – 2021 England Open
  – 2021 Denmark Open
  – 2021 Welsh Open
 

Regional Table QualifiersFirst round
  – East Europe
  – Australia
  – New Zealand
  – Canada

  – West Europe
  – USA
 

WDF Rankings to 22 playersFirst round
 
 
 
 
 
 
 
 

Assen QualifierFirst round
 

Lakeside QualifierFirst round

Draw

Boys'

Format and qualifiers
All boys that will be under the age of 18 on 9 January 2022 shall be eligible to play in the 2022 Lakeside WDF Boys World Championship tournaments. The semi-finals and final of the tournament shall be played at the Lakeside Country Club, Frimley Green, England as a part of the 2022 WDF World Darts Championships tournament.

Qualifying criteria is as follows (cut-off date 4 December 2021):

 Two qualifiers from the final qualification tournament in Assen, Netherlands on 5 December 2021
 Two qualifiers from the final qualification tournament in Frimley Green, England on 5 December 2021

Assen Qualifiers
 
 

Lakeside Qualifiers

Draw

Girls'

Format and qualifiers
All girls that will be under the age of 18 on 9 January 2022 shall be eligible to play in the 2022 Lakeside WDF Girls World Championship tournaments. Final of the tournament shall be played at the Lakeside Country Club, Frimley Green, England as a part of the 2022 WDF World Darts Championships tournament.

Qualifying criteria is as follows (cut-off date 4 December 2021):

 One qualifier from the final qualification tournament in Assen, Netherlands on 5 December 2021
 One qualifier from the final qualification tournament in Frimley Green, England on 5 December 2021

Assen Qualifier
 

Lakeside Qualifier

Draw

Statistics

Top averages
This table shows the highest averages achieved by players throughout the tournament.

Representation
This table shows the number of players by country in the 2022 WDF World Darts Championship. A total of 18 nationalities were represented.

Men's

Women's

Boys

Girls

References

External links
WDF Tournament Center

World Darts Championship
World Darts Championship
World Darts Championship
World Darts Championship
World Darts Championship
WDF World Darts
WDF World Darts Championships